The Nations Cup 1966-67 was the seventh edition of a European rugby union championship for national teams, and second with the formula and the name of "Nations Cup". The Tournament was won by France, who swept all their matches, with Romania, Italy and Portugal. Portugal, who had the chance to play with the three best teams from Continental Europe, achieved an honourable 6-3 loss to Italy, but, having lost all their matches, were relegated. France did not award caps in their 56-14 win over Portugal abroad.

First division 
Table

Portugal relegated to second division

Results

Second division 
Table

Czechoslovakia promoted in first division

Results

Marocco-Netherlands not played

Bibliography 
 Francesco Volpe, Valerio Vecchiarelli (2000), 2000 Italia in Meta, Storia della nazionale italiana di rugby dagli albori al Sei Nazioni, GS Editore (2000) 
 Francesco Volpe, Paolo Pacitti (Author), Rugby 2000, GTE Gruppo Editorale (1999).

References

External links
 FIRA-AER official website

1966–67 in European rugby union
1966-67
1967 rugby union tournaments for national teams
1966 rugby union tournaments for national teams